Nicholas Weston may refer to:
 Nicholas Weston (MP for Newtown) (1611–1656)
 Nicholas Weston (MP for Malmesbury) (fl. 1373–1383)